Sam Laidlow (born December 23, 1998 in Oakley, Bedfordshire.) is a French professional triathlete. 

Sam came second in the (second) 2022 Ironman World Championships in Kona, Hawaii, breaking the bike course record.  He showed promise finishing 8th at his first Ironman World Championships at the age of 23 (the youngest athlete in the professional field). Other results include a 2nd Place Finish at Ironman UK, and a win at the Spanish Irondistance race in the Girona Province (140.6INN)

Career 

In 2001, his parents decided to move from the UK to the South of France in order to set up a triathlon training business – Sancture Sportifs. At the age of 13 he decided to leave his home in Amélie-les-Bains-Palalda for the National Altitude Training Centre in Font Romeu. 3 years later Sam was selected to train alongside the French team in Montpellier. At the age of 17 he went back home to his family in Amélie-les-Bains-Palalda and started to being coached by his father Richard Laidlow.

He won the Bearman Xtreme Iron distance race in 2017 and the Lakesman in 2019, setting the fastest iron-distance time ever recorded in the United Kingdom.  At the Cannes International Triathlon in 2018, he was leading Javier Gómez for most of the race when his rear derailleur broke. He ran 20km with his bike and completed the race regardless.   In 2019, he finished 7th at Ironman Barcelona in a time of 8:05h.

With his strengths being the first two disciplines of triathlon (swimming and cycling), Sam is often known for being at the front of the races assuming a more aggressive racing style. Sam also represented Team Europe at the 2nd edition of The Collins Cup in Samorin.

Race History 

Key: DNF = Did not finish

External links 
 Official website of Sam Laidlow

References 

French male triathletes
1998 births
Living people